is the fifth and final instalment of Tecmo's Captain Tsubasa video game series. It's a sequel of Captain Tsubasa 4: Pro no Rival Tachi and was released exclusively in Japan for Nintendo's Super Famicom on December 9, 1994.

Summary
The game differs greatly from its "Cinematic Soccer" oriented predecessors. It adopts a new gameplay with a classic view of the pitch and improved graphics. It features various RPG elements with special techniques of characters, known from Captain Tsubasa manga and anime series. Players strongly resembling real-life stars of the time: Thomas Häßler, Júlio César da Silva, Jean-Pierre Papin, Peter Schmeichel, Franco Baresi, Ronald Koeman, Tomas Brolin, Dennis Bergkamp, or Gabriel Batistuta are present in the game. Tecmo also introduced its own characters, like  Brazilian ace Signori, skilful forward Alcion, and world class goalkeeper Savičević, among others.

The game's story mode focuses mainly on Tsubasa's Serie A season with Lecce and international campaign with Japan. In addition, other characters like Kojiro Hyuga, Genzo Wakabayashi, Lui Napoleón, Carlos Santana or Karl-Heinz Schneider have their less-expanded scenarios as well. The competitions in the game are based on real major international tournaments, like Asian Cup, Copa América and World Cup. In the All-star mode, the players can create new characters, arrange a friendly match (with all the teams, or by composing an own squad from all the players available in the game) and create a league with national or club teams.

Selected characters

   — based on football legend Pelé; he plays for Canarinho Stars - the strongest team in the game, which consists of players inspired by classic Brazilian stars: Garrincha, Gilmar, Rivelino or Zico; he does not possess any special techniques, however his individual attributes are extremely high.
   — playmaker and leader of Albicelestes, loosely based on Diego Maradona; Díaz has five different shot techniques and a combination technique with teammate Alan Pascal - Argentina Combi.
   — skilful midfielder of AC Milan, inspired by Dutch Ballon d'Or winner Ruud Gullit.
   — coach of Campione and former tutor of Roberto Hongo; taught his best players (Nitta, Alcion and Signori) the unique technique - Geijutsu Teki Dribble.
   — player with decent technique, based on Nwankwo Kanu from 1993 FIFA U-17 World Championship winning team; characters resembling other members of that squad: Wilson Oruma and Celestine Babayaro are also present in the game.
   — arguably the best defender in the game, he plays for Malaysia and Campione; hard to beat due to his special defensive techniques: block, charge and tackle.
   — world-class forward with total of 8 special techniques, including potent Neofire Shot; Schneider plays for Bayern Munich and is one of Tsubasa's greatest rivals.
   — one of the most important characters in this instalment of the game; arrogant Brazilian midfielder/forward with effective dribble and trademark Axel Spin Shot, Signori plays for Seleção and Parma.
   — star player of AC Milan and Italy, known from Captain Tsubasa 4; he is able to beat most of goalkeepers with his powerful Megaton Shot.
   — based on Marco van Basten; possess very good shot technique and heading ability; despite his great skills, he is only substitute at Milan. At the time of the release of the game, Van Basten was seriously injured, which resulted in his early retirement.

Teams

Original Captain Tsubasa teams 
  Nankatsu
  Toho FC

Club teams 
  Portuguesa
  São Paulo
  Fiorentina
  Genoa
  Inter
  Juventus
  Lecce
  Milan
  Parma
  Roma
  Sampdoria
  Torino
  FC Köln
  Bayern Munich
  Eintracht Frankfurt
  Hamburger SV
  Werder Bremen
  Stuttgart
  Bordeaux
  Paris Saint-Germain
  Manchester United
  Feyenoord

National teams

CONMEBOL 
  Argentina
  Bolivia
  Brazil
  Chile
  Uruguay
  Venezuela

CONCACAF 
  United States

UEFA 
  France
  Germany
  Italy
  Netherlands

CAF 
  Ghana
  Morocco
  Nigeria

AFC 
  Iraq
  Japan
  Korea
  Malaysia
  Philippines
  Qatar
  Saudi Arabia
  United Arab Emirates

Others 
 Campione
  Ichigaya Kingdom
  Canarinho Stars

Voices
 Alcion (Kōichi Hashimoto)
 Genzo Wakabayashi (Kōichi Hashimoto)
 Karl-Heinz Schneider (Keiichi Nanba)
 Ken Wakashimazu (Nobuo Tobita)
 Kojiro Hyuga (Hirotaka Suzuoki)
 Taro Misaki (Eiko Yamada)
 Tsubasa Oozora (Yōko Ogai)

Critical reception
The game received good reviews and still remains popular among Captain Tsubasa fans. The Japanese website Wazap! gave this game a total score of 78.7 out of 100.

Guide book
On January 15, 1995, Shueisha published a 104 pages guide book from V Jump, featuring players' profiles, extensive in-game strategies, and a fold-out mini-poster.

Possible sequel
During the story mode there were two explicit references that could foresee a possible sequel: the Dutch Van Berg challenging Tsubasa after the match against the Netherlands, when he refers to a new super shot that he has developed, and especially the rant of an angry Alcion after the final match, where he explicitly states a revenge in Captain Tsubasa 6. However, since then, Tecmo has not developed any Captain Tsubasa game and with those characters.

Translations
The game was unofficially translated into various languages: English, Brazilian Portuguese, Italian, Spanish, Chinese or Arabic. The translations were not authorized by Nintendo.

See also
 List of Captain Tsubasa characters
 Top Striker
 Ace Striker
 Super Formation Soccer 95: della Serie A
 Hat Trick Hero 2

References

External links
 Soundtrack information at SNESmusic
 Captain Tsubasa 5 at Giant Bomb
 Captain Tsubasa 5 (Complete guide)  at capitantsubasa.net 

1994 video games
Hasha no Shogo Campione
Association football video games
Japan-exclusive video games
Sports video games set in Italy
Super Nintendo Entertainment System games
Super Nintendo Entertainment System-only games
Tecmo games
Video games developed in Japan
Video games scored by Hiroshi Miyazaki
Video games set in Japan
Video game sequels
Multiplayer and single-player video games